The England cricket team toured Sri Lanka in February and March 2001, playing three Test matches and three One Day Internationals. England won the Test series 2–1, while Sri Lanka took the ODI series 3–0.

Test series

1st Test

2nd Test

3rd Test

ODI series

1st ODI

2nd ODI

3rd ODI

References

2001 in English cricket
2001 in Sri Lankan cricket
2000-01
International cricket competitions in 2000–01
Sri Lankan cricket seasons from 2000–01